Jason William Simontacchi (born November 13, 1973) is a pitching coordinator in the Kansas City Royals organization. He was the pitching coach for the Springfield Cardinals, the Double-A minor league affiliate of the St. Louis Cardinals from 2014–2018. He pitched in the minors from – and from –2004, in the organizations of the Kansas City Royals (1996-), Pittsburgh Pirates (1999), Minnesota Twins (2001), and St. Louis Cardinals (2002–2004), where he made his major league debut. He finished his pitching career in the independent leagues in 2008 and 2010.

College
After transferring from De Anza College, Simontacchi attended San Jose State University in the 1994–95 school year and pledged the Cal Iota chapter of the Phi Delta Theta fraternity as a member of the Alpha Theta pledge class. Simontacchi completed his collegiate baseball career at the College of Idaho.

Minor league career

Major league career
He had an ERA of 2.34 and a record of 5-1 in 2002 for the Triple-A Memphis Redbirds, a year in which he played mostly with the St. Louis Cardinals as a 28-year-old rookie. Through his first 13 starts with the Cardinals, he went 7-1 with a 2.82 ERA. He finished the season with an 11-5 record in 24 starts, and ninth in Rookie of the Year voting. In , he was 9–5 as a part-time starter with 16 starts and an ERA of 5.56.

2004-2006 
Simontacchi suffered right shoulder problems from a torn labrum in 2004, and was released by the Cardinals at the end of the year. He subsequently missed the entirety of the  season.

Simontacchi considered playing for Italy at the 2006 World Baseball Classic, but ultimately decided not to. He signed a minor-league deal with the Chicago Cubs for the  season, but his contract was voided. However, he pitched 10 games in the independent Atlantic League for the Bridgeport Bluefish with an ERA of 0.84. He then pitched for the Estrellas Orientales in the Dominican Winter Baseball League and in his five starts went 3-1 with a 2.02 ERA over 27 innings.

2007 
In 2007, he was a non-roster invitee to the Washington Nationals in spring training, and was projected to be in the Nationals starting rotation until a groin injury sidelined him. He rehabbed in Triple-A, and when starters Jerome Williams and John Patterson both went on the 15-day disabled list in the span of 10 days, he was called up and started against the Milwaukee Brewers on May 8. He pitched well until giving up a three-run home run in the sixth inning and then receiving the loss. In his second start, on May 13, 2007, he pitched  innings, and collected his first major league win since 2003. By mid-July, he was 6–7 with an ERA of 6.37. He experienced elbow soreness after a start on July 15, and five days later landed on the disabled list due to right elbow tendinitis. Simontacchi became a free agent at the end of the season.

2008 
Simontacchi pitched in the Independent Atlantic League in 2008 with the Long Island Ducks.

2010 
Simontacchi was a starting pitcher for the Lancaster Barnstormers of the Atlantic League during the 2010 season.

Coaching career
In 2013, Simontacchi became the pitching coach with the Single-A St. Louis Cardinals-affiliated Peoria Chiefs. In 2014, he was promoted to the Springfield Cardinals, the Double-A affiliate of the Cardinals.
As of 2019, Simontacchi is now a pitching coordinator in the Kansas City Royals organization.

References

External links

1973 births
Living people
American people of Italian descent
American expatriate baseball players in Canada
Baseball players at the 2000 Summer Olympics
Baseball players from California
Bridgeport Bluefish players
Cardenales de Lara players
College of Idaho Coyotes baseball players
Columbus Clippers players
De Anza Dons baseball players
Edmonton Trappers players
Estrellas Orientales players
American expatriate baseball players in the Dominican Republic
Hickory Crawdads players
Lancaster Barnstormers players
Lansing Lugnuts players
Long Island Ducks players
Major League Baseball pitchers
Memphis Redbirds players
Minor league baseball coaches
Navegantes del Magallanes players
American expatriate baseball players in Venezuela
Olympic baseball players of Italy
People from Mountain View, California
Rimini Baseball Club players
San Jose State Spartans baseball players
Spokane Indians players
Springfield Capitals players
St. Louis Cardinals players
Tiburones de La Guaira players
Washington Nationals players